Armando Salati (1884–1963) was an Italian Vice Consul to the United States, and Philadelphia Honorary Consul from 1913–1940.

Family 
Armando Salati, born June 20, 1884, was the eldest son of Ottavio and Adelaide Salati of the Comune di Gioi, Campania, Italy. Armando married Julia LaFazia in Philadelphia, Pennsylvania on February 2, 1914; and they had eight children, one of which died as an infant.

Career 
After graduating from law school in Italy, Armando Salati became a Lieutenant in the Italian Army. In 1912, he was offered an opportunity from the King of Italy to join the Italian Consulate in the United States. As Italian Vice Consul, he became Philadelphia Honorary Consul, serving from 1913 to 1940. Armando Salati became acting Consul in 1938, following the recall to Italy of Philadelphia Consul Edoardo Pervan, who had been accused by the House Un-American Activities Committee of being a Fascist propagandist. Salati held this post until Ludovico Censi was named Philadelphia Consul in 1939. The consulate was located at 2128 Locust Street in Philadelphia. In 1942 with the entry of the United States  into World War II, the U.S. Government froze Italian assets, forbade Italians from leaving the country, and closed the consulates. The Philadelphia Consulate did not reopen until 1947, representing the Italian Republic which had replaced the Kingdom of Italy in 1946. In retirement, Salati returned to his home in Gioi, Campania, Italy in 1951. He died at his ancestral home on January 4, 1963.

Inventor 
Armando Salati was granted United States patent #1,246,791 on November 13, 1917, as a subject of the King of Italy.

Recognition 
Armando Salati was awarded Cavaliere of the Italian Crown by Victor Emmanuel III of Italy in 1921.

See also 
Gioi
Order of the Crown of Italy
List of Italian orders of knighthood
Victor Emmanuel III of Italy
Kingdom of Italy
Italian Republic

References

External links 
  Consolato Generale D'Italia in Philadelphia
  Embassy of Italy to the United States
  Findagrave Memorial for Armando Salati
  Comune di Gioi
  Societa Organizzata da Gioiesi in Nord-America

1884 births
1963 deaths
Recipients of the Order of the Crown (Italy)
Italian expatriates in the United States